This article is a list of newspapers in Jersey.

Jersey Evening Post

Defunct newspapers
This is a partial list of some of the more notable and long-lived Jersey newspapers.

Le Magasin de Jersey (1784-1785) - first newspaper published in Jersey
La Gazette de Jersey (1786-1797)
Le Soleil de Jersey (1792-1798)
Gazette de l'Île de Jersey (1797-1814)
La Gazette de Césarée (1809-1820)
La Chronique de Jersey (1814-1917)
Le Constitutionnel (1820-1876)
The British Press (1822-1823) - first English language newspaper published in Jersey
The British Press and Jersey Times (1823-1910) - amalgamated with The British Press
La Patrie (1849-1855) - produced by Robert Pipon Marett
L'Homme (1853-1855) - produced by Victor Hugo in exile with the proscrits
La Nouvelle Chronique de Jersey (1855-1917)
Jersey Independent (1855-1910)
La Lanterne Magique (1868-1873)
La Voix des Îles (1873-1874)
The Morning News (1909-1949) - suspended during the German Occupation
Deutsche Inselzeitung (1940-1945) - German language newspaper for occupying troops
Les Chroniques de Jersey (1917-1959) - amalgamation of La Chronique de Jersey and La Nouvelle Chronique de Jersey
The Island Eye (1990-1991)
Channel Island Sunday Times (1991)

References
George d'la Forge: Guardian of the Jersey Norman heritage – A study of the life and writings of George Francis Le Feuvre (1891–1984), Annette Torode, Jersey, 2003, 

Jersey
Newspapers published in Jersey
Newspapers
Lists of organisations based in Jersey